Balana is a village in Central Province, Sri Lanka.

Balana may also refer to:

Bălana, a right tributary of the river Ghighiu in Romania
Balana fort, fort built by the Kingdom of Kandy near Alagalla Mountain Range, Sri Lanka

See also
Balanas